"Saving Grace" is a short story by American writer Orson Scott Card. It appears in his short story collection Maps in a Mirror.

See also 
List of works by Orson Scott Card

External links
 Official Orson Scott Card website

Short stories by Orson Scott Card
1990 short stories